Victor Burgin (born 1941) is a British artist and writer. Burgin first came to attention as a conceptual artist in the late 1960s (Harrison & Wood, 1992; Walker, 2001) and at that time was most noted for being a political photographer of the left, who would fuse photographs and words in the same picture.  He has worked with photography and film, calling painting "the anachronistic daubing of woven fabrics with coloured mud" (Burgin, 1976). His work is influenced by a variety of theorists and philosophers, most especially thinkers such as Sigmund Freud, Henri Lefebvre, André Breton, Maurice Merleau-Ponty, Michel Foucault and Roland Barthes. (European Graduate School Staff Page)

Education

Burgin was born in Sheffield in England. He studied art at the Royal College of Art, in London, from 1962 to 1965 (A.R.C.A., 1st Class, 1965) before going to the United States to study at Yale University (M.F.A. 1967).

Academic career

Burgin taught at Trent Polytechnic from 1967 to 1973 and at the School of Communication, Polytechnic of Central London from 1973 to 1988. From 1988 to 2001 Burgin lived and worked in San Francisco. He taught in the History of Consciousness program at the University of California, Santa Cruz, where he became Professor Emeritus of History of Consciousness. In 2000 he was Robert Gwathmey Chair in Art and Architecture, The Cooper Union for the Advancement of Science and Art, New York. From 2001 to 2006 he was Millard Professor of Fine Art at Goldsmiths College, University of London. He is currently Professor of Visual Studies, Winchester School of Art, University of Southampton. In 2005 he received an Honorary Degree of Doctor of Sheffield Hallam University (Hon. DUniv). In 2010 he received a Doctorat Honoris Causa from the Université de Liège.

Honours and awards

In 1986, Burgin was nominated for the Turner Prize for his exhibitions at the Institute of Contemporary Arts and Kettle's Yard Gallery in Cambridge and for a collection of his theoretical writings (The End of Art Theory) and a monograph of his visual work (Between).

Public commissions
 1976  'What does possession mean to you?,' color poster, 1000 copies posted in the streets in the center of Newcastle upon Tyne, summer; other poster works, various dates.
 1987  Fall, Video-wall (36 monitors), two-minute videodisk programme, Mississauga Shopping Mall, and other locations, Toronto.
 1989  Fall, Video-wall [Edited version (9 monitors)], two-minute videodisk programme, Tate Gallery, London.
 1989  Original print for ‘Estampes et Revolution: 200 Ans Après,’ Centre National des Arts Plastiques, Ministère de la Culture et de la Communication, France (100 sets of prints, commissioned from an international selection of artists, and distributed throughout France as part of the Bicentennial Celebration of the French Revolution).
 1993  Poster for 'Images pour la lutte contre le sida', Ministère de la Culture et de la Communication, France/Agence française de lutte contre le sida: national poster campaign with posters commissioned from an international selection of 35 artists.
 1993 Venise, 30 min video, Ville de Marseille, France.
 1994  Design for permanent video installation for the Hotel Furkablick, Furkapasshöhe, Switzerland.
 1994  Permanent video installation for the Médiatheque d'Orléans, Ville d'Orléans, France.
 2004  Restored, Permanent video installation for London Symphony Orchestra, St. Luke's, Old Street, London.
 2021  'Division/Revision', poster project curated by Uta Kögelsberger, Newcastle University

Books and monographs on or by Burgin
 1973  Work and Commentary, London, Latimer
 1976 Two Essays on Art, Photography and Semiotics, London, Robert Self Publications
 1977 Victor Burgin, Eindhoven, Stedelijk van abbemuseum
 1977 Family, New York, Lapp Princess Press, Ltd., in association with Printer Matter, Inc.
 1982 Hôtel Latône, Calais, Edition Musée de Calais
 1982 Thinking Photography, Victor Burgin (ed.), [Burgin: Introduction, three essays, bibliography], The Macmillan Press Ltd., London and Basingstoke, and Humanities Press International, New Jersey (1982), reprinted 1983, 1984, 1985, 1987 (twice), 1988, 1990, 1992, 1993, 1994
 1986 Formations of Fantasy, (co-edited with Donald, J. and Kaplan, C.), Methuen, London
 1986 Between, Basil Blackwell, Oxford and New York
 1986 The End of Art Theory: Criticism and Postmodernity, Macmillan Press, London and Basingstoke, and Humanities Press International, New Jersey (1986), reprinted 1987, 1988, 1992, 1993, 1996
 1988 Victor Burgin: Office at Night and Danaïdes/Dames, Charlotte, North Carolina, Knight Gallery, City of Charlotte
 1988 Victor Burgin, Opere 1982–1986, Milan, Le Case d’Arte
 1989 Taideteorian Loppu, Helsinki, Suomen Valokuvataiteen Museon Säätiö, Literos, collection of essays by Burgin in Finnish translation
 1991 Passages, Lille, Musée d’art moderne de la Communaté Urbaine de Lille, Villeneuve d’Ascq
 1995 History Painting, Buffalo, University at Buffalo Art Gallery/Research Center in Art + Culture 
 1995  Japanese translation of The End of Art Theory: Criticism and Postmodernity, Tokyo, Keiso Shobo Publishers
 1996 Some Cities, Berkeley and Los Angeles, University of California Press, and London, Reaktion Books
 1996 In/Different Spaces: place and memory in visual culture, Berkeley and Los Angeles, University of California Press
 1997 Szerelmes Levelek/Love Letters, Mücsarnok Museum, Budapest
 2000 Victor Burgin: Robert Gwathmey Lectures, New York, Cooper Union for the Advancement of Science and Art  1997 Venise, London, Black Dog Publishing
 2000 Shadowed, London, Architectural Association
 2001 Victor Burgin, Barcelona, Fundació Antoni Tàpies
 2002 Relocating, London and Bristol, Arnolfini
 2004 Ensayos, Barcelona, Gustavo Gili
 2004 The Remembered Film, London, Reaktion Books
 2006 Victor Burgin — Voyage to Italy, Hatje Cantz
 2007 Objets Temporels, Boulouch, Nathalie; Mavridorakis, Valérie; Perreau, David (Eds.), Presses Universitaires de Rennes
 2008 Components of a Practice, Skira
 2009 Situational Aesthetics, Leuven University Press
 2013 Palmanova, Victor Burgin, Teresa Castro, Evgenia Giannouri, Lucia Monteiro, Clara Schulmann, Form[e]s, Paris
 2014 Five Pieces for Projection, Museum für Gegenwartskunst, Seigen
 2014 Projective - Essays on the works of Victor Burgin, Victor Burgin, Gülru Çakmak, David Campany, Homay King, David Rodowick, Anthony Vidler, Musée d'Art Moderne et Contemporain, Geneva
 2014 ''Projectif  – Essais sur l’oeuvre de Victor Burgin, French translation of Projective 
 2016 Scripts, Musée d'Art Moderne et Contemporain, Geneva
 2016 Barthes/Burgin - Research notes for an exhibition, Ryan Bishop and Sunil Manghani (eds),Edinburgh University Press 
 2017 Victor Burgin's Parzival in Leuven - Reflections on the "Uncinematic", Stéphane Symons (ed.), Leuven University Press
 2018 The Camera - Essence and Apparatus, Mack, London
 2019 Mandarin, Juxta Press, Milan
 2019 Afterlife, Galerie Thomas Zander & Walther König
 2019 Le Film qui me reste en mémoire, French translation of The Remembered Film, Mimesis, Paris
 2019 Seeing Degree Zero, Barthes/Burgin and Political Aesthetics, Ryan Bishop and Sunil Manghani (eds), Edinburgh University Press
 2020 Alexander Streitberger, Psychical Realism - The work of Victor Burgin, Leuven University Press
 2020 Between (second edition), Mack, London

References

General references
 Harrison, C. and Wood, P. (Eds.). (1992). Art in theory, 1900-1990: an anthology of changing ideas (Vol. 3). Oxford, UK & Malden, MA: Blackwell.
 Walker, J. A. (2001). Left Shift: Radical Art in 1970s Britain. IB Tauris.

External links
 Victor Burgin in conversation with David Campany, Leslie Dick and Cristin Tierney, December 2020
Afterlife (2019) Web based work, Chrome browser on desktop only
'Art is not a spectator sport': the confounding work of Victor Burgin – in pictures The Guardian, 16/12/2020 
Lia Rumma Gallery, Milan and Naples
Thomas Zander Gallery, Cologne
Cristin Tierney Gallery, New York
Victor Burgin and Ian Wallace in conversation, Vancouver Art Gallery, 2013
The Ubuweb-Anthology of Conceptual Writing Website
The Separateness of Things on Tate Website
Thomas Dreher: Intermedia Art: Konzeptuelle Kunst with two German articles on Victor Burgin (Memory Piece 1969, Park Edge 1987, Angelus Novus 1995 (English translation at PDF))
Victor Burgin Exhibition at Fundació Antoni Tàpies (2001).

1941 births
Living people
Academics of Goldsmiths, University of London
Artists from Sheffield
Photographers from Yorkshire
Yale School of Art alumni
English contemporary artists
British conceptual artists
Academics of Nottingham Trent University